Palai is a small town in Sri Lanka.

Palai may also refer to:
 Palai (Assembly constituency), of Kerala, in India
 Palai Central Bank, of Kerala, India
 Syro-Malabar Eparchy of Palai, Kerala, India — "Palai", an eparchy in the Syro-Malabar Catholic Church
 Palai, Malakand, Khyber Pakhtunkhwa, Pakistan

See also
 Pala (disambiguation)
 Palais (disambiguation)